The Buckminster Gliding Club (BGC) is a gliding club based at Saltby Airfield on the Leicestershire / Lincolnshire border, England. It is affiliated with the British Gliding Association (BGA) and runs a seven-day-a-week operation throughout the year with the exception of Christmas Day.

History and changes
Saltby Airfield was an active RAF station during World War II, one of many such stations on the eastern side of the country. British, American and Polish squadrons were based there.

The airfield originally had three concrete runways that intersected in the middle. The main entrance was in the village of Saltby. Over the years, the airfield has changed. Many of the original buildings have been demolished, and one of the concrete runways was completely removed. Approximately half of the land within the original perimeter track is now used for agriculture. The remaining half of the airfield contains the entire main runway (07/25) as well as half of the second remaining runway (02/20) (which still runs from the start of 02 to its intersection with 07/25).  The old hangar now covers just part of the concrete footprint of the original war-time main hangar. Alongside 07/25 is a grass runway of similar width and the same length which is primarily used for the winch launching of gliders, and for most landings, so avoiding the aerotow operation on the concrete runway.

The currently active airfield is much smaller than the original and no longer has direct access to Saltby village; instead there is a new entrance on the road between the villages of Skillington and Sproxton. The club is named after Buckminster Estate, from which the airfield is rented.

The Viking Way runs across the airfield passing near the start of runway 25. It is a popular route for horse riders, quad bike riders and walkers.

Present day

The Buckminster Gliding Club was founded at Saltby in 1971. Today its members fly cross-country and aerobatics and they train new pilots.

The club has a campsite, adjacent to the car park and main hangar, currently housing a number of caravans and statics, both serviced with electricity. This campsite becomes busier in the main summer months, and particularly during competition weeks and weekends. Some members also choose to pitch tents.

The club has about 150 full-time members (at January 2023). Some own shares in some of the latest types of gliders, such as: LS8-18, ASW28-18, ASW 22 and Duo Discus T. Motor gliders are also based there. Its members compete in several competitions each year, and annually the club itself hosts one round in the Eastern Interclub League, the first round of the 'Yellow Bung Trophy' and two national aerobatics competitions.

The club is currently (at January 2007) expanding its operations and has in recent years: 
 Increased its cross country flying activities,
 Started NPPL training,
 Bought the new K21 training glider,
 Rented further land on which to rig gliders,
 Built new offices and store rooms above the main clubroom at the front of the main hangar,
 Installed a broadband connection and Wifi hotspot to improve communications for both the club office and members and visitors.

In 2006 the club built a new private hangar to house ten aircraft, in such a way that any aircraft may be moved in or out without the need to move another aircraft. Due to the success of this, a further three bays will soon be added to one end of the hangar.

The 2006 summer soaring season was the most active for the club for some years.Five members competed at the Midland Regional Competition at The Soaring Centre (Husbands Bosworth), and others competed at the Bicester Regionals, Lasham Regionals, Competition Enterprise at Aboyne and The Northerns at the Yorkshire Gliding Club (Sutton Bank). The club was once again very active in the Eastern Interclub League, and won overall in the two part Yellow Bung Trophy.

The 2007 soaring season sees further pushes into rated competitions with pilots entered into the Midland Regionals Competition at The Soaring Centre (Husbands Bosworth), the Bicester Regionals, The Gransden Regionals at the Cambridge Gliding Centre, the 18 m Nationals and Competition Enterprise.

Each year in September the club hosts a popular 1940's big band night in the hangar and visitors are encouraged to dress in period costume for this event.

In late 2007 the club continued the expansion of its facilities with new building work that will see a new toilet block and extended clubhouse and kitchen area built.

The club is also home to the university gliding club, Loughborough Students Union Gliding Club. This allows students from both Loughborough University and Loughborough College to learn to fly.

Club Fleet 
The club owns and operates a fleet of gliders available for club members to use. The fleet comprises

Two seater gliders 
Allstar Perkoz (S8Y)

ASK-21 (KNL)

Puchacz (FTH)

Single Seater Gliders 
Ka-8b (JGB)

Astir (FSH)

Astir (LU) This glider is owned and operated by Loughborough Students Union Gliding Club, it is based at Buckminster Gliding club and is available for club members to use.

Motor gliders 
T61 (G-BUFR)

Tug planes 
Eurofox (G-TTUG)

Robin (G-TUGY)

Winch 
Skylaunch Two Drum Winch

References

External links
Buckminster GC
Buckminster GC Cloud

Gliding in England
Flying clubs